The buff-bellied mannikin (Lonchura melaena), also known as the sooty munia or Bismarck munia, is a species of estrildid finch found in New Britain and Buka Island. It has an estimated global extent of occurrence of 20,000 to 50,000 km2.

It is found in subtropical and tropical dry grassland habitat. The status of the species is evaluated as Least Concern.

References

BirdLife Species Factsheet

buff-bellied mannikin
Birds of New Britain
Birds of Bougainville Island
buff-bellied mannikin
buff-bellied mannikin